Butler Carson Derrick Jr.  (September 30, 1936 – May 5, 2014) was an American politician and a U.S. Representative from South Carolina.

Born in Springfield, Massachusetts, he moved to his parents' home state of South Carolina in his youth and attended the public schools in Mayesville and Florence. He graduated from the University of South Carolina in 1958 and earned an LL.B. from the University of Georgia Law School in 1965. He was admitted to the South Carolina bar in 1965 and commenced practice in Edgefield. He served in the South Carolina House of Representatives from 1969 to 1974, representing Edgefield County, and was a delegate to the South Carolina State Democratic conventions in 1972 and 1974.

Derrick was a delegate to the Democratic National Convention in 1974. He was reelected nine times. Although he represented a district that had become increasingly friendly to Republicans at the national level, he himself only faced serious opposition in 1988. Derrick served on the House Rules and Budget Committees during his tenure, and spent his final term as a Chief Deputy Whip.

Derrick did not run for reelection in 1994. As a measure of how Republican this district had become, one-term Republican state representative Lindsey Graham won the seat in a rout, taking 60 percent of the vote. By comparison, Derrick had won what would be his last election in 1992 with 61 percent of the vote. No Democrat has cleared the 40 percent barrier in the district since Derrick left office. This included 1996, when Graham defeated Debbie Dorn, William Jennings Bryan Dorn's daughter, with 60 percent of the vote to Dorn's 39 percent.

After retirement from Congress, he was a partner of Nelson Mullins Riley & Scarborough LLP in Washington, DC. He was elected to the Common Cause National Governing Board in 2009. After Congress, Derrick resided with his family in Charleston until a few years before his death, when he moved to Easley.

Derrick died of cancer at his home in Easley on May 5, 2014.

References

External links 

 Butler Derrick Papers at the University of South Carolina's South Carolina Political Collections

1936 births
2014 deaths
Democratic Party members of the South Carolina House of Representatives
University of Georgia School of Law alumni
Politicians from Springfield, Massachusetts
People from Easley, South Carolina
University of South Carolina alumni
South Carolina lawyers
Lawyers from Washington, D.C.
Deaths from cancer in South Carolina
Democratic Party members of the United States House of Representatives from South Carolina
20th-century American politicians
20th-century American lawyers